Luis Horna and Nicolás Massú were the defending champions, but both players turned 18 years old during the season and, therefore, were not eligible to compete in Juniors.

Roger Federer and Olivier Rochus defeated Michaël Llodra and Andy Ram in the final, 6–4, 6–4 to win the boys' doubles tennis title at the 1998 Wimbledon Championships. It was the 2nd doubles title for Federer and the 3rd doubles title for Rochus in their respective Juniors careers. It was also the 2nd title for the pair in the circuit, after their win in the LTA International Junior Championships at the same year.

Seeds

 n/a
  Jérôme Haehnel /  Julien Jeanpierre (first round)
  Simon Dickson /  David Sherwood (first round)
  Michaël Llodra /  Andy Ram (final)

Draw

Draw

References

External links

Boys' Doubles
Wimbledon Championship by year – Boys' doubles